There has been a community of Greeks in Chile since the sixteenth century. The Greek community in Chile is estimated to have 150,000 descendants. Most reside either in the Santiago, Coquimbo or in the Antofagasta area.

Immigration
The first immigrants from Greece arrived during the sixteenth century from Crete, and surnamed "Candia" after the island's capital, the current Heraklion. The surname, although at present, is very disconnected from its ancient origins. The majority of Greek immigrants arrived in Chile at the beginning of the 20th century, some as part of their spirit of adventure and escape from the rigors of the First World War and the burning of Smyrna in Asia Minor, although many Greeks had already settled in Antofagasta, including crews of the ships commanded by Arturo Prat for the Pacific War (1879–1883) in the naval battle of Iquique (boatswain Constantine Micalvi). Included are Aromanians and Megleno-Romanians, who became adjusted to Chilean society because of the linguistic closeness and similarities between Aromanian, Megleno-Romanian, and Spanish, all  Romance languages.

Amid this flood of foreigners who populated northern Chilean appeared the Greeks. There were numerous Collectivité Hellenic whose records were listed in the newspaper El Mercurio of Antofagasta, which said that between 1920 and 1935 there were about 4,000 Greeks in the city, and another 3,000 in saltpeter offices.

In 1926 the first women's association for excellence, filóptoxos (friends of the poor) was set up, chaired by Xrisí Almallotis. Since then  there have been four or five generations of descendants of Greeks. Some have moved south and are grouped mainly in Santiago and Valparaíso. Others returned to Greece after the First World War, but most of the immigrants stayed in their new country and formed Greek-Chilean families. Constantino Kochifas Carcamo, owner of cruise company Cruceros Skorpios in Puerto Montt, is a member of this community.

Antofagasta 
Antofagasta is a community in Latin America established in 1890, notable for a town anniversary on 14 February, in which foreign communities set up a stand.  Many of the original families moved to Santiago and Valparaíso, however there are still an estimated seventy current residents who were born in Greece.

Notable people

 Mónica de Calixto, TV journalist.
 Uranía Haltenhoff Nikiforos, model.
 Ángela Jeria, mother of Michelle Bachelet, president of Chile.
 Alexandros Jusakos, public figure.
 Irina Karamanos, first lady of Chile.
 Constantino Kochifas, public figure.
 Demetrio Marinakis, public figure.
 Diana Massis, political.
 Patricio Mekis Spikin, public figure.
 Federico Mekis, political.
 Gabriel Orphanopoulos Barker, sportsmanship.
 Arístides Progulakis, TV journalist.
 Stavros Mosjos,  CNN journalist and radio host.
 Víctor Tevah Tellias, public figure.
 Manuel Tricallotis, painter.
 Alex Zisis, actor.

See also
Chilean-Greek relations
 Greek diaspora

References

External links
  Bilateral relations between Greece and Chile 
      Embassy of Greece in Chile
  Main Greek association in Chile
     Greek association of Antofagasta
  Greek association of Coquimbo

European Chilean
Chile